Gopi Krishna is a 1992 Indian Kannada-language romantic comedy film directed and enacted by Ravichandran in the lead role. Also starring Rupini, Sumithra and Lokesh, the film was a remake of 1962 Hindi film Professor though the story is credited to P.Vasu who directed the Tamil remake  Nadigan(1990).

Music and lyrics was composed by Hamsalekha. The film was produced by N. Veeraswamy for his home banner Eshwari Productions.

Cast 

 Ravichandran as Gopikrishna/Muddukrishna
 Rupini as Geetha
 Jyothi as Seetha
 Sumithra
 Lokesh
 Avinash as Avinash
 Mukhyamantri Chandru as musician
 Mandeep Roy
 Girija Lokesh
 Rekha Das 
 Ananthrao Maccheri
 Baby Sanathani

Track list

References

External links 

1990s Kannada-language films
1992 films
Films directed by V. Ravichandran
Films scored by Hamsalekha
Kannada remakes of Hindi films